Naisi Chen (born February 1994) is a New Zealand politician and Member of Parliament in the House of Representatives for the Labour Party.

Early life and career
Chen was born in Beijing, China and moved to New Zealand at age five. Her father is a Christian pastor and her mother is a doctor of traditional Chinese medicine.

She worked as president of the New Zealand Chinese Students' Association and as a director of a business consultancy firm.

Political career

She was ranked 50th on the Labour party list. In addition, Chen contested the  electorate, but was defeated by Erica Stanford. The previous Labour candidate for the seat withdrew.

Chen also contested the  electorate. Despite losing the Botany electorate to National's Christopher Luxon by a margin of 3,999 votes, she was ranked high enough on the Labour list to get into Parliament.

Alleged links to the Chinese Communist Party
In September 2017, New Zealand sinologist and University of Canterbury political scientist Anne-Marie Brady alleged in a conference paper that Chen had "close […] connections" to the United Front, a network of groups and individuals and strategy the Chinese Communist Party (CCP) uses to advance its agenda. Brady cited Chen's leadership of New Zealand Chinese Students' Association, a "united front-related organization", as evidence. Chen said she felt "hurt" by the accusations. Prior to the 2020 election, members of the group New Zealand Values Alliance distributed flyers in Auckland alleging that Chen was a "CCP agent".

References 

Living people
New Zealand people of Chinese descent
Chinese emigrants to New Zealand
New Zealand Labour Party MPs
New Zealand list MPs
Members of the New Zealand House of Representatives
Candidates in the 2020 New Zealand general election
Unsuccessful candidates in the 2017 New Zealand general election
21st-century New Zealand politicians
21st-century New Zealand women politicians
Women members of the New Zealand House of Representatives
1994 births